The 1962 season of the Primera División Peruana, the top category of Peruvian football, was played by 10 teams. The national champions were Alianza Lima.

Results

Standings

Title

External links
Peru 1962 season at RSSSF
Peruvian Football League News 

Peru1
1962 in Peruvian football
Peruvian Primera División seasons